Rubén Juancarlos Matamoros Montoya (born 19 August 1982) is a Honduran football player who currently plays for Pumas de San Isidro as a midfielder.

Club career
Matamoros  had a couple of seasons with F.C. Motagua and then also played for Hispano F.C., Club Deportivo Olimpia and C.D. Necaxa.

In Summer 2012, Matamoros joined newly promoted C.D. Real Sociedad. He played the 2013 Clausura for second division side Pumas de San Isidro.

Honours and awards

Club
F.C. Motagua
Copa Interclubes UNCAF (1): 2007

References

1982 births
Living people
Sportspeople from Tegucigalpa
Association football midfielders
Honduran footballers
F.C. Motagua players
Hispano players
C.D. Real Sociedad players
Liga Nacional de Fútbol Profesional de Honduras players